Air is the name given to the atmosphere of Earth.

Air or AIR may also refer to:

Arts, entertainment, and media

Art
Air (Maillol), a sculpture by Aristide Maillol
Air (painting), a painting by Jan van Kessel the Elder

Films
Air (2005 film), a 2005 anime adaptation of the visual novel
Air (2015 film), an American post-apocalyptic film
Air (2023 film), an American biographical drama film
"Air/Love is destructive", the first half of The End of Evangelion, a 1997 anime film

Music

Groups
Air (French band), a French electronic music duo
Air (free jazz trio), founded in 1971
Air (jazz rock band), a jazz rock group featuring Tom and Googie Coppola
Air (singer), Japanese singer

Albums
Air (Cecil Taylor album), 1960
Air (Agua de Annique album), 2007
Air (Astronoid album), 2016
Air (Sault album), 2022
Air, an album by Air (jazz rock band), 1971
Air, an album by Pete Namlook, 1993
Air, an album by Kym, 2005
Air, an album by Andreas Vollenweider, 2009
AIR, an EP by Afgan, 2019

Songs
"Air" (song), by Tyson Ritter, 2013
"Air", a song in the musical Hair
"Air", a song by Ekseption from their self-titled 1969 album Ekseption
"Air", a song by Brian Eno and Talking Heads from the 1979 album Fear of Music
"Air", a song by Ben Folds Five from the 1998 soundtrack Godzilla: The Album
"Air", a song by Shawn Mendes and Astrid S from the 2015 album Handwritten
"A.I.R.", a song by Anthrax from their 1985 album Spreading the Disease

Other music-related uses
Air (music), a song-like vocal or instrumental composition
Air on the G String, August Wilhelmj's adaptation of an air by Johann Sebastian Bach
Air de cour, secular vocal music in France in the late Renaissance and early Baroque period
Air guitar, a form of dance and movement in which a performer pretends to play an imaginary guitar
Associated Independent Recording (AIR), an independent recording company and recording studio based in London, UK
Australian Independent Record Labels Association, organisation representing Australian-owned record labels and independent artists

Radio
All India Radio, radio broadcast service in India
Art International Radio, an arts-oriented radio station

Television
AIR: America's Investigative Reports, PBS documentary series 2006–2007, retitled Exposé: America's Investigative Reports with second season in 2007
"Air" (Stargate Universe), the series premiere of the television series Stargate Universe

Video games
Air (video game), a 2000 Japanese visual novel
Air, an air combat based mainframe computer game by Kelton Flinn

Other arts, entertainment, and media-related uses
ABS-CBN International Report, a defunct international newscast of ABS-CBN Broadcasting Corporation
A.I.R. Gallery, an all female artists cooperative gallery in the United States
Air, a common colloquialism for a broadcast ("on air")
Air (comics), a comic book series published by the Vertigo imprint of DC Comics
AIR (nightclub), a 2000 capacity superclub located in Digbeth, Birmingham in the UK
Air (novel), a 2005 novel by author Geoff Ryman
Air (roller coaster), the former name of a flying roller coaster at Alton Towers theme park in the United Kingdom, now re-themed as Galactica
Annals of Improbable Research, a bi-monthly magazine devoted to scientific humour
Art Is Resistance, an organization in the game Year Zero

Brands and organisations
AIR Worldwide (formerly named Applied Insurance Research) is a risk-modeling and data analytics company headquartered in Boston, Massachusetts
AAR Corporation (New York Stock Exchange ticker symbol AIR)
Air Jordan, a popular brand of basketball shoes promoted by Retired Chicago Bulls Superstar, Michael Jordan
American Institutes for Research, commonly abbreviated AIR, a social science research organization

Computing and technology
AIR (program), a program suite for medical image registration
Adobe AIR, a cross-platform run-time system
iPad Air, an Apple tablet
MacBook Air, an Apple ultraportable laptop

Places
Aïr Mountains, a massif in northern Niger
Sultanate of Agadez, also known as the Sultanate of Aïr
Arab Islamic Republic, failed union attempt between Tunisia and Libya

People
Donna Air (born 1979), British actress
Glen Air (born 1978), Australian rugby league player
Michael Jordan, American basketball player nicknamed His Royal Airness
Steve McNair, American football player nicknamed Air

Science and healthcare
Aminoimidazole ribotide
Anterior interval release, a type of arthroscopic knee surgery
Oxygen
Gas or atmosphere of a planet
The sky

Sports
Adelaide International Raceway, a car-racing circuit in Adelaide, South Australia
 Air, a range of boardsport tricks consisting of jumps without rotation
"Airs" above the ground, a term used in dressage

Technology
Active Infrared, combines infrared illumination of spectral range 700–1,000 nm (just below the visible spectrum of the human eye) with CCD cameras sensitive to this light
Air conditioning, any form of cooling, heating, ventilation or disinfection that modifies the condition of air
Air injection reactor, a very early automobile emissions control system
Air-to-air rocket or air interception rocket, an unguided projectile fired from aircraft to engage other flying targets

Transportation
 AIR, National Rail code of Airbles railway station, in Motherwell, Scotland
 AIR-X, a Soviet aircraft series by Yakovlev
 AIR, MTR station code of Airport station, Hong Kong
 Lucid Air, a 2021–present American electric executive sedan
 Wuling Air EV, a 2022–present Chinese electric microcar

Other uses
 Air (classical element), an element in ancient Greek philosophy and in Western alchemy
 Airoran language, an Indonesian language with ISO 639-3 code AIR
 Applied Innovative Research, a scientific journal
 Compressed air, the air kept under a pressure that is greater than atmospheric pressure
 Another word for ambience (character, mood, etc.).

See also
 Air University (disambiguation)
Aiir (album), by British band Sault, 2022
Aire (disambiguation)
AIRS (disambiguation)
Ayr (disambiguation)
Ayre, one of six sheadings in the Isle of Man
Éire